No Justice is a Red Dirt/Texas Country band which was originally from Stillwater, Oklahoma.

History
The band was formed in 2001. It has its origins in a covers band that included Jerry Payne and two of the other original members, adopting the name No Justice. They began writing original songs and recruited local artist Steve Rice on lead vocals and guitar.

In September 2007, No Justice released their first live album, Live at Billy Bob's CD/DVD, joining a long list of artists in the Live at Billy Bob's series. Originally released as a limited edition CD/DVD combo, it was re-released in 2008 with the full track listing. The album included the band's more popular songs from the previous albums, as well as three new tracks, two of which were also included as studio recordings. At the end of the last track of live recording, the band included their own version of U2's "With or Without You", from the 1987 album The Joshua Tree. A cover of Ryan Adams' "Shakedown on 9th Street", from the 2000 album Heartbreaker is included, as well as a cover version of Todd Snider's "Horseshoe Lake", from the 2005 album That Was Me: Best Of. The original limited edition issue consisted of CD containing a condensed version of the live recording, as well as a DVD of the concert and bonus features, including a photo gallery and interviews with the band.

By late 2009, the group had landed a new record deal with Carved Records. In 2010, the band's lineup was singer/guitarist Steve Rice, guitarist Jerry Payne, bassist Joey Treviño (who joined in 2008), drummer Armando Lopez and lead guitarist Cody Patton.

2nd Avenue (2010) was more rock-oriented than their earlier work, but the band returned to their roots with America's Son (2012), produced by Dexter Green. By 2012 the band's lineup was Rice, Patton, Lopez, vocalist/bassist Justin Morris, and keyboard player Bryce Conway.

Current band status
On September 5, 2013, No Justice announced via their Facebook page that the band would be splitting up. The final tour ended in October at the Wormy Dog Saloon in OKC, Oklahoma. The band started playing select shows again in 2015 and still plays at select venues currently. No Justice teamed up with Red 11 Music and producer Dex Green to record a 3 song EP in May of 2019. They are currently not on tour but playing select venues throughout the country.

Musical style
While often categorized as 'Red Dirt', the band's music incorporates country, rock, R&B, blues, and funk. Singer Rice described the band's sound as an "Americana-Southern Rock blend".

Discography

Albums

More to live For 3:33- (Steve Rice)
 *more songs to come throughout 2019.

Music videos

References

External links
 Band website
 Carved Records page on No Justice

American country rock groups
Country music groups from Oklahoma
2001 establishments in Oklahoma
Musical groups established in 2001
Carved Records artists